Dr. Robert Emlyn Havard (1901–1985) was the physician of C.S. Lewis, his wife Joy Gresham, and J.R.R. Tolkien. Havard has also been credited as a "skilled and prolific writer".

Interactions with other writer 
In addition to his medical research papers, Havard authored an appendix for C. S. Lewis's The Problem of Pain as well as a description of Lewis included in Remembering C. S. Lewis: Recollections of Those Who Knew Him and one of J. R. R. Tolkien included in Mythlore.

Lewis invited Havard to join the Oxford-based Inklings because of the literary interests he shared with that group. Like Tolkien, he was a Roman Catholic. Havard was sometimes referred to by the Inklings as the "Useless Quack," mainly because Warren Lewis once called him so upon being irritated by his tardiness, and his brother, Jack, thought it quite amusing at the time and caused the nickname to continue. The abbreviation "U.Q." was thereafter a common reference to Havard.

Hugo Dyson once called him "Humphrey" when he could not remember his name. After that, Havard was quite frequently known as "Dr. Humphrey Havard," to the extent that when Douglas Gresham came to know him years later and became his patient, it was some time before he discovered Robert Havard's actual name was not really Humphrey.

References

1901 births
1985 deaths
Alumni of Keble College, Oxford
20th-century English medical doctors
Inklings